Ernst Pringsheim Sr. (11 July 1859 – 28 June 1917) was a German physicist. He was born and died in Breslau. He made, together with Otto Lummer, important measurements of the blackbody radiation spectrum, leading to Max Planck's quantum hypothesis in 1900.

Literary works
 Ueber das Radiometer. Berlin: Lange, 1882. Berlin, Universität, Dissertation, 1882.
 Eine Wellenlängenmessung im ultrarothen Sonnenspectrum. In: Annalen der Physik und Chemie. Neue Folge, Band XVIII, (1883).
  (with Otto Lummer:) A Determination of the ratio k of the specific heat for air, oxygen, carbon-dioxide and hydrogen. (= Smithsonian Contributions to Knowledge; 29,6 = 1126 Hodgkins Fund) Washington : Smithsonian Inst., 1898.
 Vorlesungen über die Physik der Sonne. Leipzig: Teubner, 1910.
 Fluoreszenz und Phosphoreszenz im Lichte der neueren Atomtheorie, 1928.

References

  

20th-century German physicists
Academic staff of Charles University
1859 births
1917 deaths
19th-century German physicists
Scientists from Wrocław